The Watkins 17, also referred to as the W17, is an American trailerable sailboat that was designed by the Watkins brothers and first built in 1975.

Production
The design was built by Watkins Yachts in Clearwater, Florida, United States from 1975 to 1981, with over 100 examples completed. Production was curtailed in 1979, when the company was sold, with few boats built in 1979-1981. The design's moulds were eventually abandoned behind the old plant building when the company was wound up in 1989. The building was sold to an electrical contractor and the moulds are presumed to have been destroyed.

Design
The Watkins 17 is a recreational keelboat, built predominantly of hand-laid 24 oz rove fiberglass, with wood trim. The deck is a single piece of moulded fibreglass and the cockpit is self-bailing. It has a fractional sloop rig with aluminum spars made by Kenyan, a small, storage cuddy cabin, a spooned plumb stem, a vertical transom, a transom-hung rudder made from Philippine mahogany controlled by tiller and a centerboard keel.

A hot-dipped galvanized trailer was included with the boat.

Operational history
The boat is supported by an active class club, the Watkins Owners.

Most of the Watkins 17s built were sold to a local Florida sailing club for use as one design racers.

See also
List of sailing boat types

Similar sailboats
DS-16
Nordica 16
Sirocco 15

References

Keelboats
1970s sailboat type designs
Sailing yachts
Trailer sailers
Sailboat type designs by Watkins brothers
Sailboat types built by Watkins Yachts